The Armed Forces Cycling Classic (formerly known as the Air Force Association Cycling Classic) refers to a weekend of road bicycle racing events held annually in June in Arlington, Virginia, United States. The weekend consists of several amateur events, and two professional races in the criterium format, the Clarendon Cup and the Crystal City Cup. The main sponsor for the race is Boeing.  The race is conducted under the rules of the governing bodies of professional cycling, the Union Cycliste Internationale and USA Cycling.

Clarendon Cup

The Clarendon Cup, known as the CSC Invitational (from 2004-2008, is a 1km long criterium race of Arlington, Virginia. It is open to amateurs and professionals and has been running since 1998 for men and women. It was formerly part of USA Cycling's National Racing Calendar, and the National Criterium Calendar. It is currently part of USA Cycling's Pro Road Tour https://www.usacycling.org/national-calendars/pro-road-tour.

Winners

Men

Source:

Women

Source:

Crystal Cup

The Crystal Cup, is also a criterium race, taking place on a 1.3km course in Crystal City, Virginia. It is open to amateurs and professionals and has been running since 2007 for men and women, except for the 2008 and 2009 editions when there was no women's race held, and the men took part in a circuit race rather than a criterium. It is held on the Sunday of the weekend of racing.

Winners

Men

Source:

Women

Source:

References

External links 
 

Cycle races in the United States
Road bicycle races
Recurring sporting events established in 1998
1998 establishments in Virginia